Federal Highway 22 (Fed. 22) is a free part of the federal highways corridors in two improved segments.

Fed. 22 in Baja California Sur runs from Fed. 1 in Ciudad Constitución to Puerto San Carlos. The total length of this segment of the highway is 57 km (35.4 mi).

Fed. 22 in Aguascalientes runs from Fed. 45 in Rincón de Romos to Fed. 25 in Ciénega Grande. The total length of this segment of the highway is 36 km (22.37 mi).

References

022